Fuentelespino de Moya is a municipality in Cuenca, Castile-La Mancha, Spain. It has a population of 149.

Municipalities in the Province of Cuenca